Mark Anthony McKee (born 1 December 1998) is a Northern Irish professional footballer who plays as a midfielder for Ballymena & Provincial League club St James' Swifts.

McKee began his career at Cliftonville before signing a scholarship with English League Two club Stevenage in 2015. He broke into the Stevenage first-team during the 2016–17 season. McKee spent four years at Stevenage before being released by the club at the end of the 2018–19 season. He returned to Cliftonville in September 2019, before signing for Warrenpoint Town, also of the NIFL Premiership, in February 2020. McKee signed for Cliftonville for a third spell in October 2020, making one appearance there before joining St James' Swifts in July 2021. He has also represented Northern Ireland at under-17 and under-19 level.

Club career

Early career
McKee began his career in the youth system at NIFL Premiership club Cliftonville, before signing for Stevenage for an undisclosed fee in the summer of 2015. The move came about after he had impressed then-Stevenage coach Darren Sarll who was watching a Northern Ireland under-16s match in Belfast. Sarll was there to finalise the signing of Nathan Kerr, but also ended up enquiring about McKee joining Stevenage on a scholarship contract.

Stevenage
He played in a number of Stevenage's pre-season friendlies ahead of the 2016–17 season, and subsequently signed his first professional contract in August 2016. He played predominantly for the club's under-18 team during the campaign, and signed "an extended deal" with the Hertfordshire club on 3 February 2017. McKee made his professional debut on 8 April 2017, coming on as a 71st minute substitute in a 4–0 away defeat to Colchester United. After the match, he was singled out for praise by manager Sarll, who stated "Mark can be anything he wants. He can be the best one we have ever blooded. In all the years back, even extending back to George Boyd, this boy can be a very good player". Two weeks later, on 22 April 2017, he made his first starting appearance, playing the opening 55 minutes in a 1–0 defeat to Mansfield Town at Broadhall Way.

Following on from his two appearances in the first-team the previous season, McKee opened the 2017–18 season with a place in the starting line-up, playing as a striker in Stevenage's 3–3 draw against Newport County on the opening day of the campaign. He made a sporadic number of appearances in the first three months of the campaign without cementing his place in the first-team. This changed after he was deployed in a midfield role in Stevenage's 1–1 home draw against Coventry City on 21 November 2017, for which he earned Man of the Match for his performance. Stevenage chairman Phil Wallace stated there had been transfer interest from a number of Championship and Premier League clubs for McKee during the 2018 January transfer window, with the club discouraging bids for the player as they believe he will develop faster playing first-team football as opposed to "being lost in the under-23 environment of a Premier League club". McKee scored his first professional goal on 3 February 2018, courtesy of a low drilled shot, in a 3–2 defeat at Accrington Stanley. He made 29 appearances during the campaign, scoring once, in what was McKee's breakthrough season as a first-team regular.

Despite playing regularly for Stevenage the previous campaign, McKee played just once during the first half of the 2018–19 season. He returned to the first-team as a 79th-minute substitute in a 1–0 home defeat to Bury on 9 March 2019. McKee ended the season coming on as a substitute in Stevenage's last four matches as the club finished in 10th-position in League Two, one point off of the play-off places. He made eight appearances during the season. McKee was released by Stevenage at the end of the season.

Cliftonville
McKee signed for NIFL Premiership club Cliftonville, the club he had played for at academy level, on 10 October 2019. He made his debut in Cliftonville's 3–0 away victory at Institute on 19 October 2019, coming on as an 83rd-minute substitute in the match. McKee made four appearances, scoring once in a 4–0 win against Warrenpoint Town, during the first half of the 2019–20 season. He subsequently joined Warrenpoint Town on 7 February 2020, scoring once in two games before the season was curtailed due to the COVID-19 pandemic. McKee rejoined Cliftonville on 5 October 2020 after spending time on trial with the club prior to the 2020–21 season, impressing manager Paddy McLaughlin with his attitude in training, as well as his performances in pre-season matches. He made one appearance during his third spell at Cliftonville.

St James' Swifts
McKee signed for Ballymena & Provincial League club St James' Swifts on 23 July 2021.

International career
Having featured regularly for Northern Ireland's under-17 team for two years, McKee was then called up to the Northern Ireland under-19s in October 2016 for their three 2017 UEFA European under-19 Championship qualification group matches. He featured in all three matches, scoring once.

Career statistics

References

External links

1998 births
Living people
Association football forwards
Association footballers from Northern Ireland
Stevenage F.C. players
Cliftonville F.C. players
Warrenpoint Town F.C. players
English Football League players